Federal Highway 14 (Fed. 14) is a free part of the federal highways corridors of Mexico.

Fed. 14 in Sonora runs from Fed. 15 north of Hermosillo east to Huásabas. Fed. 17 intersects with Fed. 14 in Moctezuma, Sonora. The total length of the highway is 212.5 km (132.04 mi).

Fed. 14 in Michoacán runs from Fed. 37 in Uruapan to Morelia. The highway passes through the towns of San Andrés Coru, Santiago Tingambato, Huiramangaro and Pátzcuaro. The total length of the highway is 113.3 km (70.4 mi).

References

014